The 2017 Judo Grand Slam was held in Abu Dhabi, United Arab Emirates, from 26 to 26 October 2017.

Medal summary

Men's events

Women's events

Source Results

Medal table

References

External links
 

2017 IJF World Tour
2017 Judo Grand Slam
Judo
Grand Slam Abu Dhabi 2017
Judo
Judo